Limmattaler Zeitung, commonly shortened to Limmattaler, is a Swiss German-language daily newspaper, published in Dietikon in the Limmat Valley.

History and profile 
The newspaper was first published in 1972 as Limmattaler Tagblatt by Der Limmattaler AG , situated in Dietikon, Canton of Zürich. The current name Limmattaler Zeitung dates from a 2008 merger with the local newspaper Bezirksanzeiger Dietikon. In 2010 the company was bought and absorbed by regional Swiss media conglomerate AZ Medien.

See also 
 Limmat Valley

References

External links 
  

1972 establishments in Switzerland
Daily newspapers published in Switzerland
German-language newspapers published in Switzerland
Dietikon
Newspapers established in 1972
Newspapers published in Zürich
Limmat